Bang! Records is a Spanish label from Basque Country formed in 1998 by Gorka Munster and Juan-Mari Iturrarte.  The label has a primary focus on artists from Melbourne, Australia and New York City's swamp, noise and punk blues music scene.  Acts among the Bang! Records roster include The Beasts Of Bourbon,  The Scientists, Rowland S. Howard of The Birthday Party, Brian Henry Hooper, The Drones, The Gun Club and Jeffrey Lee Pierce.

History
Bang! Records was originally conceived by Gorka Munster with the aim of releasing 7-inch vinyl singles. The first release appeared in 1998 with a 7-inch single release by Senor No. This was followed by singles from Brother Brick, The Hellacopters and The Nomads.  With the addition of Juan-Mari Iturrarte, the label expanded to include gatefold vinyl LP releases and reissues with a growing focus on the Australian swamp blues music scene.

To mark the label's ten year anniversary, the Big Bang! Festival was held August 15 and 16 2008, at Collingwood's The Tote Hotel.  The festival featured performances by Kim Salmon & The Surrealists, The Kill Devil Hills, Stu Thomas, Brian Henry Hooper, Spencer P. Jones, Hugo Race and others.

Artists

 The Beasts Of Bourbon
 The Scientists
 Rowland S. Howard
 The Gun Club
 Spencer P. Jones
 Brian Henry Hooper
 The Drones
 The Chrome Cranks
 Hugo Race
 Kim Salmon and the Surrealists
 Five Dollar Priest
 Woman
 Ian Rilen
 The Bakelite Age
 Jerry Teel and the Big City Stompers
 Jeffrey Lee Pierce
 The Hellacopters
 Boris Sujdovic
 The Devastations
 Sacred Cowboys
 The Meanies
 The Kill Devil Hills
 The Green Mist
 Stu Thomas
 The Nomads
 Dimi Dero, Inc.
 Penny Ikinger
 The Butcher Shop
 Tiger By The Tail
 Black Pony Express
 The Celibate Rifles
 The Proton Energy Pills
 The Seminal Rats
 James McCann
 Senor No
 The Voyeurs
 Brother Brick
 The Yes Men
 Bored!
 Leadfinger
 The Scoundrelles
 Asteroid B-612
 Los Dingos
 The Slappers
 The Flaming Stars
 The Powder Monkeys

See also
 List of record labels

References

External links
 Bang! Records official website

Spanish independent record labels
Garage rock record labels
Noise music record labels
Record labels disestablished in 1998
Swamp rock record labels
Punk blues record labels